Janice Winifred O'Hara [״Jenny״] (November 30, 1918 – March 7, 2001) was a pitcher and utility who played from  through  in the All-American Girls Professional Baseball League.

Janice O'Hara was one of the sixty original players to join the All-American Girls Professional Baseball League for its inaugural season. A valuable and versatile player, she had an array of pitches that kept the hitters guessing, and also played several positions competently during her seven years in the league.

Born in Beardstown, Illinois, O'Hara started playing organized softball in Springfield in her teen years, until AAGPBL scout Eddie Stumpf interviewed her and sent her to the final tryout at Wrigley Field in Chicago. In the process, she  signed a contract and joined the Kenosha Comets, playing for them her entire career in the league.

Comets manager Josh Billings used O'Hara at first base and she hit a respectable .187 average and posted career-numbers in hits (63), triples (6), runs (46) and RBI (28), helping Kenosha win the second half of the 1943 season. The team faced first-half winner Racine Belles in the best-of-five series and was shut out in three games.

By 1944, new manager Marty McManus turned O'Hara into a utility player. She collected a personal-high 37 stolen bases and belted the only home run of her career in that season. After that, she mostly played at first base and in the outfield, but also filled in at second base and third base through the 1946 season.

In 1947 O'Hara was converted into a pitcher by then manager Ralph Shinners. In her repertoire she included a fastball, a curve and specially a knuckleball, which she loved to use. She turned in a 6–8 record with a 3.51 earned run average in 21 appearances. The next year she went 4–6 in 20 games while lowering her ERA to 3.20. Used sparingly in 1949, she had a 2–3 mark and a 4.65 ERA in 11 games.

In a seven-year career, O'Hara posted a 13–17 record and a 3.56 ERA in 55 games. As a hitter, she batted a .199 average in 309 games. In three postseason appearances, she batted .130 (3-for-23) in seven games and hurled six innings of shutout ball for a perfect 0.00 ERA.

Following her baseball career, O'Hara worked as an accountant for 31 years and retired in 1982. She later spent her time in the garden and attended AAGPBL Players Association reunions. The association was largely responsible for the opening of Women in Baseball, a permanent display at the Baseball Hall of Fame and Museum in Cooperstown, New York, which was unveiled in 1988 to honor the entire All-American Girls Professional Baseball League.

Janice O'Hara died in 2001 in Tulsa, Oklahoma, at the age of 82.

Career statistics
Pitching

Batting

Fielding

Sources

All-American Girls Professional Baseball League players
Baseball players from Illinois
People from Beardstown, Illinois
1918 births
2001 deaths
20th-century American women
20th-century American people